The 1925 Case football team was an American football team that represented the Case School of Applied Science, now a part of Case Western Reserve University, during the 1925 college football season. In its second season under head coach Robert H. Fletcher, the team compiled a 3–4–2 record. The team played its home games at Van Horn Field in Cleveland.

Schedule

References

Case
Case Western Reserve Spartans football seasons
Case Scientists football